Peter Gilbert (born ) is an American documentary filmmaker. He was the cinematographer and one of the producers of Hoop Dreams, a 1994 documentary about two teenage basketball players in Chicago. He has worked on several films for Kartemquin Films, including Vietnam, Long Time Coming, At the Death House Door (which he co-directed with Steve James), and In the Game. He was nominated for a Primetime Emmy for Exceptional Merit In Nonfiction Filmmaking in 2005 for producing With All Deliberate Speed, a documentary about Brown v. Board of Education. Prior to Hoop Dreams, he worked on the cinematography of American Dream by Barbara Kopple, and with Haskell Wexler. He is a member of the Academy of Motion Picture Arts and Sciences.

, he lives in Chicago, where he grew up.

Filmography

References

External links 
 

Living people
1950s births
Place of birth missing (living people)
Year of birth uncertain
American documentary film producers
American documentary film directors